The Queich Valley Cycleway is a cycle path in Germany that runs from Hauenstein to Germersheim. It begins in Hauenstein at the source of the River Queich in the Palatine Forest and passes, inter alia, through Rinnthal, Landau in der Pfalz and Offenbach an der Queich, until it ends in Germersheim.

References 

Cycleways in Germany
Transport in Rhineland-Palatinate
South Palatinate
Palatinate Forest